The International Wine & Spirit Competition is an annual wine and spirit competition founded in 1969 by the German/British oenologist Anton Massel. Each year the competition receives entries from over 90 countries worldwide. The awards given by the competition are considered as high honors in the industry. The event occurs annually in November, in London. Only products which pay the entry fee of £140 per category are judged, and three/four bottles of each product must be supplied.

Depending on the points out of 100 awarded, submitted products can receive gold outstanding, gold, silver outstanding, silver, or bronze awards, and there are no limitations on how many of each which can be awarded. There is also an extensive range of trophies each year.

Judging
The judging process consists of blind tasting and panel discussion. Entries are judged by panels drawn from 250 specialists from around the world.

Judging processes
The competition has its own purpose built premises including temperature controlled cellars, tasting rooms and regular staff. In 2019, IWSC wine judging moved to London for the first time. The competition has its own storage facilities and cellaring for over 30,000 bottles.

It takes over six months to judge all the products as they are sorted into over 1,500 categories. The categories divide the entries by several factors:  region or area;   variety, style, or type; vintage or age; and similar characteristics. Wines and spirits that win awards go forward to the national or international level.

The competition makes use of over 250 specialist judges from all over the world. Many are Masters of Wine, some are winemakers or distillers, others are trade specialists, each judging in their special field. All judges attend an IWSC judges induction course.

Annual IWSC banquet
The competition culminates in London in November with the annual awards presentation and banquet, at the City of London Guildhall.

Presidents
A president is selected annually from influential individuals  in the wines and  spirits industry. After their term, they serve  on the competition’s Advisory Board. 

 2020 Tamara Roberts, UK
 2019 George Fistonich, New Zealand
 2018 Facundo L. Bacardi
 2017 Chris Blandy, Portugal
 2016 Matteo Lunelli, Italy
 2015 Neil McGuigan, Australia
 2014 Dr Laura Catena, Argentina
 2013 G. Garvin Brown IV, USA
 2012 Mauricio Gonzalez Gordon, Spain
 2011 Prince Robert of Luxembourg, France
 2010 Prinz Michael zu Salm-Salm, Germany
 2009 Sir Ian Good, UK
 2008 Rafael Guilisasti, Chile
 2007 Gina Gallo, USA
 2006 Anthony von Mandl, Canada
 2005 Wolf Blass, Australia
 2004 Paul Symington, Portugal
 2003 Claes Dahlbäck, Sweden
 2002 Dominique Hériard Dubreuil, France
 2001 Warren Winiarski, USA
 2000 Baroness Philippine de Rothschild, France
 1999 Miguel A. Torres, Spain
 1998 Sir Anthony Greener, UK
 1997 Jean Hugel, France
 1996 Dr.Anton Rupert, South Africa
 1995 Marchese Leonardo de Frescobaldi, Italy
 1994 Michael Jackaman, UK
 1993 Mme May de Lencquesaing, France
 1992 Chris Hancock Hon MW, Australia
 1991 Peter Sichel, USA
 1990 Robert Drouhin, France
 1989 Jos Ignacio Domecq, Spain
 1988 Marchese Piero Antinori, Italy
 1987 Kenneth Grahame, UK
 1986 Dr.Max Lake, Australia
 1985 Marquis de Goulaine, France
 1984 Mme Odette Pol Roger, France
 1983 Robert Mondavi Hon MW, USA
 1982 Dr. Hans Ambrosi, Germany
 1981 Harry Waugh Hon MW, UK
 1980 Peter Noble, CBE
 1979 Cyril Ray, UK
 1978 Sir Reginald Bennett VRD, UK
 1977 Lord Montagu of Beaulieu, UK

See also

 Spirits ratings

References

Further reading
 
 
 
 Fraser, Craig; (et al.) (2008). Fire Water: South African Brandy. Quivertree Publications. Page 40. .

External links
Official website

Wine tasting
Wine-related events
Distilled drinks
Wine awards
Awards established in 1969
Recurring events established in 1969